Guillermo Pérez Roldán was the defending champion, but lost in the semifinals to tournament runner-up Juan Aguilera.

Franco Davín won the title by defeating Aguilera 6–1, 6–1 in the final.

Seeds

Draw

Finals

Top half

Bottom half

References

External links
 Official results archive (ATP)
 Official results archive (ITF)

Campionati Internazionali di Sicilia
1990 ATP Tour
Camp